Serra da Canastra National Park is a national park in the Canastra Mountains of the state of Minas Gerais, Brazil.

Location

Serra da Canastra National Park is in the south west of Minas Gerais to the north of Rio Grande.
It is in the Cerrado biome.
It is administered by the Chico Mendes Institute for Biodiversity Conservation (ICMBio).
It lies in the municipalities of São Roque de Minas, Sacramento, Capitólio, Vargem Bonita, São João Batista do Glória and Delfinópolis in the state of Minas Gerais.
As of 2016 only  of the park in the tableland of Canastra had been regularized, with former owners indemnified.

Topology

The park lies on the watershed between the São Francisco and Paraná rivers.
It preserves the headwaters of the São Francisco River, which flows east from the park.
In the south it feeds the Rio Grande and in the north the Araguari River, which rises in the park and is a tributary of the Paranaíba River.
The Rio Grande and Paranaíba flow west and join to form the Paraná.

Other attractions are the Garagem de Pedras and the Curral de Pedras.
Lookout points can be accessed by car via dirt roads in good weather.
The highest peaks are almost .

Environment

Vegetation is mostly rocky fields and cerrado, with clumps of riparian forest in the valleys and ravines.

There are 45 endemic species of flora. These include members of the genera Hololepis, Inulopsis, Aspilia, Senecio, Stomatanthes, Campuloclinium, Stevia, Chinolaena, Chrysolaena, Ichtthyothere, Lessigianthus, Sinningia, Eriope, Habranthus, Ilex, Agalinis and Eryngium. Flora also include Barbacenia fulva, Barbacenia lymansmithii, Chaetostoma canastrensis, Miconia angelana, Microlicia canastrensis, Microlicia flava, Microlicia scoparia, Microlicia sp. nov, Svitramia sp. and Tibouchina sp. nov..

Fauna include bush dog, pampas deer, maned wolf, giant anteater, lontra, titi, giant armadillo (Priodontes maximus), cougar, Brazilian merganser, king vulture, toco toucan (Ramphastos toco), guan, crested caracara (Caracara plancus), greater rhea and seriema. Endemic herpetofauna are Hyla ibitiguara, Cinax canastrensis and Odontophrynus sp.

Conservation

The park is classified as IUCN protected area category II (national park).
It has the objectives of preserving natural ecosystems of great ecological relevance and scenic beauty, enabling scientific research, environmental education, outdoors recreation and eco-tourism.

Protected birds include the cock-tailed tyrant (Alectrurus tricolor), vinaceous-breasted amazon (Amazona vinacea), black-masked finch (Coryphaspiza melanotis), Brazilian merganser (Mergus octosetaceus), lesser nothura (Nothura minor) and the dwarf tinamou (Taoniscus nanus).

Other protected species include the maned wolf (Chrysocyon brachyurus), cougar (Puma concolor), oncilla (Leopardus tigrinus), ocelot (Leopardus pardalis), colocolo (Leopardus colocolo), giant armadillo (Priodontes maximus), giant anteater (Myrmecophaga tridactyla) and the frog Phyllomedusa ayeaye.

Notes

Sources

National parks of Brazil
Protected areas of Minas Gerais
Cerrado